Pablo Bardauil (born December 23, 1963) is a film actor, director, and screenplay writer.

He was born in Buenos Aires and works in the cinema of Argentina. His directorial debut, Chile 672, earned him awards for Best Screenplay from the Cine Ceará (Brazil) and the Trieste Festival of Latin American Cinema (Italy).

Filmography

Actor
 Perdido por perdido (1993)
 El Censor (1995) aka The Eyes of the Scissors
 El Fuego y el soñador (2005)
 Chile 672 (2006)

Director and writer
 Chile 672 (2006)

Notes

External links
 

20th-century Argentine male actors
Argentine male film actors
Argentine film directors
Argentine screenwriters
Male screenwriters
Argentine male writers
Argentine people of French descent
Male actors from Buenos Aires
1963 births
Living people
21st-century Argentine male actors